Michael William Farrell (born October 20, 1978) is an American retired ice hockey defenseman.

Early life 
Farrell was born in Edina, Minnesota, and raised in Carmel, Indiana. While attending Providence College, he was a member of the Providence Friars men's ice hockey team.

Career 
Drafted by the Washington Capitals in the 1998 NHL Entry Draft, Farrell spent several years in the Capitals system before he was traded to the Nashville Predators in 2003. He played 13 games in the NHL with the Capitals and Predators between 2001 and 2004, though mainly played in the minor American Hockey League, retiring in 2004.

Career statistics

Regular season and playoffs

External links

References 

1978 births
Living people
American men's ice hockey defensemen
Ice hockey players from Indiana
Ice hockey players from Minnesota
Milwaukee Admirals players
Nashville Predators players
People from Carmel, Indiana
Portland Pirates
Sportspeople from Edina, Minnesota
Washington Capitals draft picks
Washington Capitals players

Providence Friars men's ice hockey players
Providence College alumni